Radonice may refer to:
 Radonice (Chomutov District), a village in Chomutov District, Czech Republic
 Radonice (Prague-East District), a village in Prague-East District, Czech Republic
 Radonice, Poland, a village in Warsaw West County